Steve Coulter is a team owner in the NASCAR Craftsman Truck Series. His team, Xpress Motorsports, won the Truck Series championship in 2002 and 2003, with Mike Bliss and Travis Kvapil, respectively. He has also fielded cars in the Busch Series and part-time in the Winston Cup Series. He sold Xpress Motorsports to Dave Fuge in 2005.

References

External links

NASCAR team owners
Living people
Year of birth missing (living people)